The 3rd Annual Bengal Film Journalists' Association Awards were
held on 1940, honoring the best in India cinema in 1939.

Best India Film 
Aadmi

Best Bengali Film 
Jibon Maran

Best Hindi Film 
Aadmi

Best Foreign Film 
 - Pygmalion

References

External links 
 3rd BFJA Awards

Bengal Film Journalists' Association Awards
1940 film awards 
1940 in Indian cinema